Douglas William Golding is a South African flying ace of World War II, credited with 3 'kills'.

Golding joined the South African Air Force in 1940 and joined 3 Squadron SAAF flying Mohawks but in 1941 he moved to 4 Squadron SAAF in the Western Desert, flying Tomahawks. In April 1942 he returned to South Africa, flying anti submarine patrols off Durban with 10 Squadron SAAF.

He was awarded a DFC in 1942.

In October 1942 he was posted to 4 Squadron, becoming a flight commander in November 1942. He became Commanding Officer of the squadron in June 1943. The squadron converted to Spitfire Mk V's in July 1943. In October 1943 he was evacuated with malaria. On his recovery he was part of a Army/Air training team at Middle East Command until he went to Italy to command 73 Squadron in the Balkans until February 1945.

After a recurrence of his malaria, he returned to South Africa and was demobilised in 1946.

References

South African World War II flying aces
1919 births
Possibly living people
South African military personnel of World War II
People from Durban
Recipients of the Distinguished Flying Cross (United Kingdom)